Platte Township is an inactive township in Clay County, in the U.S. state of Missouri.

Platte Township was erected in 1827, taking its name from the Platte River.

References

Townships in Missouri
Townships in Clay County, Missouri